The Adam Carolla Project is an American reality television series featuring comedian Adam Carolla. The series aired on TLC from October to December 2005.

Overview
Before gaining celebrity on Loveline and The Man Show, Carolla worked as a carpenter for several years. In this series, he returns to the profession by purchasing his father's house on Hartsook Street in Valley Village, California for $739,500 and paying all expenses out of his own pocket to have it renovated. The show co-stars friends from his construction days, who do much of the renovation. The footage is a mix of celebreality television and real-life construction.

Rebroadcast 

The DIY Network picked up the broadcast rights to The Adam Carolla Project in 2011. The first episode aired on October 8, 2011 in the 10PM timeslot. The episodes have been edited down from the original 60 minute broadcast time to a 30-minute format. All personal segments about Adam Carolla, his assistant Matt, his wife Lynette and his other jobs have been removed from the show. It is strictly about the construction work on his childhood home.

References

External links

2005 American television series debuts
2005 American television series endings
2000s American reality television series
English-language television shows
Home renovation television series
TLC (TV network) original programming
Television shows set in Los Angeles
Television series by Evolution Film & Tape